Adhikari-bheda, the Sanskrit expression which is a combination of two words – "adhikari", meaning the rightful or the qualified, and "bheda", meaning distinction or difference, basically refers to the distinction between qualified persons or to the difference of the qualified aspirants capable of apprehending the same truth. The principle of Adhikari-bheda, universally accepted by the Hindus, is the foundation on which the teachings of the Upanishads, the Brahma Sutras and the Bhagavad Gita which texts contain though not contradictory various doctrines meant for people at different stages of spiritual evolution, are based, in which principle the method of Arundhati-darsananyaya i.e. the method of spotting the tiny star, Arunadhati, with the help of bigger calling them Arundhati, applies.
 
Hinduism is a composite of various darshanas; the conflict amongst them is avoided by the twin doctrines of "Adhikara" and "Ista". Adhikara means eligibility; it is not a gradation but acceptance of fact or realism in the spiritual sphere and a question of duty. A person’s faith is determined by the kind of man he is and his creed depends on his adhikara which eligibility determines his Ista or ideal. Therefore, Adhikari-bheda refers to difference in eligibility which apparent difference arises from a difference in perspective. It helps in taking adequate care of the truth of experience or soundness of doctrines. In the Bhagavad Gita, Krishna urges Arjuna to follow his caste duties of fighting and not take to the sadharana dharma of ahimsa and spared no philosophy (including code of ethics and religion) at his command for this purpose. The branches and sub-branches of Hindu philosophy and Ethics, which are largely individualistic, are based on the spiritual competence or adhikari-bheda. Thus, Adhikari-bheda is the difference in the persons who can follow certain procedures so as to discharge their respective duties.

It permits Upasana. Sankara, in conformity with this principle, replaces the concepts of truth and error with the concepts of adequacy, inadequacy and degrees of adequacy, he recognized the fact that the Ultimate cannot be formulated but a formulation of the Ultimate is not an error which formulation can serve as stepping stone to rise higher.

In Tantric yoga Adhikari-bheda is an important and integral part of the discipline called Sadhana on the premise that all are not capable of understanding, living or realizing the highest ideal for which reason a uniform discipline cannot be prescribed. Each individual has to be gradually uplifted in accordance with the discipline which is not too remote to each individual’s understanding, natural temperament and capacity. This school divides human seekers into three distinct types or categories viz – "Pasu" (the animal type), "Vira" (the heroic type) and "Divya" (the divine type), which categorisation corresponds to three stages of human evolution, for not all have the capacity to realise the highest spiritual aim in the present birth but progress made if any in the present birth is carried over to the next birth.

The principle of  Adhikari-bheda has also been made to refer to the notion that each caste and sect has its own rituals and beliefs, in a unified, but hierarchically differentiated structure within which each knows its place. and is pervasive throughout the corpus of Mahayoga and Yogini Tantras of Buddhism. It is a crucial high-Hindu principle that was also used by Swami Vivekananda for a rational defence of Hinduism.

References

Vedanta